Shenik may refer to:
Shenik, Aragatsotn, Armenia
Shenik, Armavir, Armenia